Braden Hamlin-Uele (né Uele; born 9 January 1995) is a professional rugby league footballer who plays as a  for the Cronulla-Sutherland Sharks in the NRL. He has played for both Samoa and New Zealand at international level.  

He previously played for the North Queensland Cowboys in the National Rugby League.

Background
Uele was born in Auckland, New Zealand, and is of English and Samoan and Tokelau descent.

Uele played his junior rugby league for the Glenora Bears and Point Chevalier Pirates before signing with the Sydney Roosters.

Playing career

Early career
In 2013, Uele started the season playing for the Roosters' SG Ball Cup side before he made his NYC debut later that year. In 2014, he represented the Junior Kiwis.

In 2015, Uele joined the North Queensland Cowboys, playing for their NYC side and once again representing the Junior Kiwis. After graduating from the NYC, Uele signed a two-year NRL contract with the Cowboys. This re-united Uele with Paul Green, who gave him his NYC debut while he coached the Roosters. In 2016, Uele spent the entire season playing for the Mackay Cutters, one of the Cowboys' Queensland Cup feeder clubs.

2017
In Round 21 of the 2017 NRL season, Uele made his NRL debut against the Sydney Roosters.

In August, Uele signed a two-year contract with the Cronulla-Sutherland Sharks.

2018
Uele made his debut appearance for Cronulla in Round 10 against Canberra which ended in a 24-16 victory.  Uele spent the majority of the season playing for Cronulla's feeder club team Newtown in the Intrust Super Premiership NSW.  Uele played from the bench in Newtown's grand final defeat against Canterbury.

2019
On 14 June, Uele signed a contract extension with Cronulla keeping him at the club until the end of the 2022 season.

Uele made a total of 21 appearances for Cronulla in the 2019 NRL season as the club finished in 7th spot on the table.  Uele played in the Cronulla's elimination final defeat against Manly at Brookvale Oval.

2020
He played 21 games for Cronulla in the 2020 NRL season as the club finished 8th and qualified for the finals.  He played in Cronulla's elimination final loss against Canberra.

2021
He played 19 games for Cronulla in the 2021 NRL season which saw the club narrowly miss the finals by finishing 9th on the table.

2022
Hamlin-Uele played 17 games for Cronulla in the 2022 NRL season as the club finished second on the table and qualified for the finals.  He played in both finals games which saw Cronulla eliminated in straight sets.
 
In October Hamlin-Uele was named in the Samoa squad for the 2021 Rugby League World Cup.

Statistics

NRL
 Statistics are correct as of the end of the 2022 season

International

References

External links
Cronulla Sharks profile
North Queensland Cowboys profile
Samoa profile

1995 births
Living people
Cronulla-Sutherland Sharks players
Mackay Cutters players
New Zealand national rugby league team players
New Zealand rugby league players
New Zealand people of English descent
New Zealand sportspeople of Samoan descent
New Zealand people of Tokelauan descent
North Queensland Cowboys players
Newtown Jets NSW Cup players
Rugby league players from Auckland
Rugby league props